Sharif D Rangnekar is a communications consultant, a former journalist and human rights activist. He is the ex-CEO and ex-chairman of Integral PR. Sharif has been the chairperson and President of the Public Relations Consultants Association of India (PRCAI). Sharif is also the founder of Friends of Linger - a concept band. The band released two songs Head Held High which is dedicated to the LGBTQ community in India, and Miss you, portraying a love story between two gay men. The Central Board of Film Certification (CBFC) gave Miss you an A certificate, and found 10 seconds of video objectionable. The Film Certification Appellate Tribunal (FCAT) later rescinded the directive from CBFC. Rangnekar published his first book Straight to Normal with Rupa Publications.

Criticism and reception 
Drubojyoti Borah wrote about his book in Hindustan Times, "A slim 200-something page volume, the book is not just a personal memoir, but also a breezy chronicle of a slice of India’s queer rights movement. I was slightly disappointed that the author didn’t spend more time on the meetings, the dynamics and the people. The breeziness of the book, one of its big strengths, also becomes a sticking point in some sections where maybe some pause-and-reflection at a momentous occasion, personal or professional, would be nicer."

Anthara Raghvan wrote in India Today, "Rangnekar is frank as ever, going on to disclose his emotions on his relationships with men in the book, both open and exclusive. Rangnekar also brings the ugly side of prejudice to light in his book. He describes how several hate crimes, such as the murder of Pushkin Chandra in 2004, if they were reported, received little sympathy from the press and public."

Huffington Post wrote, "Reading this memoir is like taking a journey from the India of the 1970s until the time the discriminatory Section 377 was partially struck down."

Saleem Kidwai wrote at The Wire, "Rangnekar’s book is a quick read and easily accessible for gay men going through a similar phase. It might be missing the traumatic experiences expected of such tales – rejection by family and friends, conflicts involving religion and self-loathing melodrama. Yet it is believable and moving because of its candidness, its amusing descriptions of sexual awakening and early attempts at romantic bonding."

References

External links
Integral PR

Communications consultants
21st-century Indian musicians
Indian LGBT rights activists
Living people
Year of birth missing (living people)